The Dry Blackthorn Cider Masters  was a darts tournament organised by the British Darts Organisation that started in 1983 and ended in 1989.

List of tournaments

Tournament records
 Most wins 3:  Eric Bristow. 
 Most Finals 5:  John Lowe.
 Most Semi Finals 6:  Eric Bristow,  John Lowe.
 Most Quarter Finals 7:  Eric Bristow,  John Lowe.
 Most Appearances 7:   Eric Bristow,  John Lowe.
 Youngest Winner age 26:   Eric Bristow. 
 Oldest Winner age 41:  Bob Anderson.

References

External links

Dry Blackthorn Cider Masters tournament

British Darts Organisation tournaments
Darts in the United Kingdom
1983 establishments in the United Kingdom
1989 disestablishments in the United Kingdom
Recurring sporting events established in 1983
Recurring sporting events disestablished in 1989